The Strapping Fieldhands are an American indie rock band based in Philadelphia, and are associated with the Siltbreeze label and American lo-fi psych scene. The band's first live incarnation was a three-piece opening for The Frogs. During the 1990s, the Fieldhands toured extensively with The Grifters, Guided by Voices, Pavement, V-3 and Thinking Fellers Union Local 282, playing shows with The Fall, Jon Spencer Blues Explosion,  Royal Trux and others.

Discography

Albums
 Discus (Omphalos Records, 1994)
 The Caul (The Now Sound, 1995)
 Wattle & Daub (Shangri-La Records, 1996)
 Third Kingdom (Omphalos Records, 2002)
 Alluvium Trinkets (Omphalos Records, 2018)

EPs
 The Demiurge E.P. (Siltbreeze Records, 1991)
 Future Pastoral E.P. (Siltbreeze Records, 1993)
 In The Pineys E.P. (Siltbreeze Records, 1994)

Compilations
 Gobs on the Midway - Singles 1991-95 CD (Siltbreeze Records, 1996)

Singles
 Stacey Donelly 7-inch (Siltbreeze Records, 1992)
 Neptune's World 7-inch (Siltbreeze Records, 1995)
 Sun 7-inch (Compulsiv Records, 1995)
 Goat Cheese/Porn Weasel split 7-inch with Mudhoney, (Amphetamine Reptile Records, 1995)
 Ben Franklin Airbath/Forget You split 7-inch with The Simple Ones (Shangri-La Records, 1996

Appearances
 "Just Too Much" on Pimp's Toe Accelerator E.P., (Ptolemaic Terrascope, 1994)
 "Tale from Telegewae" on Succour: The Terrascope Benefit Album, (Ptolemaic Terrascope/Flydaddy Records, 1996)
 "Ollie's Interfader" on Carry On Ooij - A Brinkman Waaghals Compilation, (Brinkman Records, 1996)
 "Porn Weasel" on Screwed Motion Picture Soundtrack, (Amphetamine Reptile Records, 1996)
 "Stacey Donnelly" on CMJ New Music March - Volume 43, (College Music Journal, 1997)
 "Boo Hoo Hoo" on Tiny Idols, (Snowglobe Records, 2005)

References
 Bush, John. [ Allmusic band biography]
 Sprague, David. Trouser Press band biography
 discogs.com Strapping Fieldhands discography at Discogs.com
 Grunnen Strapping Fieldhands page at Grunnen Rocks
 Terracope Terrascope history

External links
Official site
Strapping Fieldhands on myspace.com)

American experimental musical groups
American experimental rock groups
American art rock groups
American post-rock groups
Indie rock musical groups from Pennsylvania
Musical groups established in 1991
1991 establishments in Pennsylvania
Siltbreeze Records artists